Pradhan Mantri Bharatiya Janaushadhi Pariyojana (PMBJP) is a campaign launched by the Department of Pharmaceuticals, Government of India, to provide quality medicines at affordable prices to the masses through special kendras known as Pradhan Mantri Bharatiya Janaushadhi Pariyojana Kendra. Pradhan Mantri Bharatiya Janaushadhi Pariyojana Kendra (PMBJPK) have been set up to provide generic drugs, which are available at lesser prices but are equivalent in quality and efficacy as expensive branded drugs. BPPI (Bureau of Pharma Public Sector Undertakings of India) has been established under the Department of Pharmaceuticals, Govt. of India, with the support of all the CPSUs for co-ordinating procurement, supply and marketing of generic drugs through Pradhan Mantri Bharatiya Janaushadhi Pariyojana Kendra.

It has been launched by the UPA government in 2008 and later on relaunched by the Honourable Prime Minister of India,  Shri Narendra Modi, in the year 2015 . The campaign was undertaken through sale of generic medicines through exclusive outlets namely "Jan Aushadhi Medical Store" in various districts of the country. In September 2015, the 'Jan Aushadhi Scheme' was revamped as 'Pradhan Mantri Jan Aushadhi Yojana' (PMJAY). In November 2016, to give further impetus to the scheme, it was again renamed as "Pradhan Mantri Bharatiya Janaushadhi Pariyojana" (PMBJP).

Timeline

Benefits 
The Jan Aushadhi initiative will make available quality drugs at affordable prices through dedicated stores selling generic medicines which are available at lesser prices but are equivalent in quality and efficacy as expensive branded drugs, but maximum time mostly drugs not available in stores due to the poor procurement process and after 2015 only 40-50% drugs available in central Wearhouse. Some comparative prices are: Prices as of Sep 2013

About Jan Aushadhi Store (JAS) 
 JAS have been opened across the country.
 The normal working hours of JAS are 8 AM to 8 PM.
 All therapeutic medicines are made available from Jan Aushadhi Stores.
 In addition to medicines and surgical items supplied by BPPI, Jan Aushadhi stores also sell allied medical products commonly sold in chemist shops so as to improve the viability of running the Jan Aushadhi store.
 OTC (over-the-counter) products can be purchased by any individual without a prescription. A prescription from a registered medical practitioner is necessary for the purchase of scheduled drugs.
 BPPI (Bureau of Pharma Public Sector Undertakings of India) has been established under the Department of Pharmaceuticals, Govt. of India, with the support of all the CPSUs for co-coordinating procurement, supply and marketing of generic drugs through the Jan Aushadhi Stores.
 The quality, safety and efficacy of medicines are ensured by getting each batch of medicines procured from CPSUs as well as private suppliers tested from NABL approved laboratories and conforming to the required standards before the same are supplied to Super stockists / Jan Aushadhi Stores from the Warehouse of BPPI (but sometimes they not tested medicine and send to store when drug inspector take sample to test they find drugs not up to quality).
Jan Aushadhi Store (JAS) can be opened by State Governments or any organisation / reputed NGOs / Trusts / Private hospitals / Charitable institutions / Doctors / Unemployed pharmacist / individual entrepreneurs are eligible to apply for new Jan Aushadhi stores. The applicants shall have to employ one B Pharma / D Pharma degree holder as Pharmacist in their proposed store.

Financial support available for Jan Aushadhi Store (JAS) store owner 
The following financial support is available:

NGOs/agencies/individuals establishing Jan Aushadhi stores in Government hospital premises where space is provided free of cost by Government to operating agency:

BPPI will provide one time financial assistance up to ₹2.50 lakh as per details given below
 ₹1 lakh reimbursement of furniture and fixtures.
 ₹1 lakh by way of free medicines in the beginning.
 ₹50,000 as reimbursement for computer, internet, printer, scanner, etc.
 20% trade margin shall be included in MRP for retailers and 10% for distributors.
 Jan Aushadhi stores and Distributors will be allowed 2% of total sales or actual loss, whichever is lower, as compensation against expiry of medicines. Expired goods need not be returned to BPPI. Stocks expiring at the C&F level will entirely be the loss of BPPI.
 Credit facility will be given to store code pmbjk01 to pmbjk05600 Jan Aushadhi stores for 30 days against postdated cheques. Distributors will also get a credit of 60 days against post-dated cheques. C&F agencies will have to deposit a security amount depending upon the business.
Jan Aushadhi stores established anywhere else by private entrepreneurs / institutions / NGOs / Trusts / Charitable organizations which are linked with BPPI headquarters through the internet.
 Financial support of ₹2,50,000. This will be given @ 15% of monthly sales subject to a ceiling of ₹10,000/ per month up to the total limit of ₹1,50,000. In NE states, and naxal affected areas, tribal areas, the rate of incentive will be 15% and subject to a monthly ceiling of ₹15,000. up to the total limit of ₹2,50,000.
 The Applicants belonging to weaker sections like SC/ST/Differently-abled may be provided medicines worth ₹50,000/ – in advance within the incentive of ₹2,50,000 which will be provided in the form of 15% of monthly sales subject to a ceiling of ₹10,000/ – per month up to a total limit of ₹2,50,000.
 20% trade margin shall be included in MRP for retailers and 10% for distributors.
 Jan Aushadhi stores and Distributors will be allowed 2% of total sales or actual loss, whichever is lower, as compensation against the expiry of medicines. Expired goods need not be returned to BPPI. Stocks expiring at the C&F level will entirely be the loss of BPPI.
 Credit facility will be given to all Jan Aushadhi stores for 30 days against postdated cheques. Distributors will also get a credit of 60 days against post-dated cheques. C&F agencies will have to deposit a security amount depending upon the business.

External links 
 Official Website - Informative portal
Chemistonline.in - Solo portal to sell Janaushadhi medicines & products online.

References 

Government schemes in India
Health programmes in India
Modi administration initiatives
2008 establishments in India